Emyr is a given name. Notable people with the name include:

Emyr Humphreys (born 1919), leading Welsh novelist, poet and author
Emyr Jones Parry, GCMG, FInstP (born 1947), retired British diplomat
Emyr Lewis (born 1968), former Wales international rugby union player
Emyr Llewelyn, Welsh political activist
Emyr Wyn Lewis (born 1982), Welsh rugby union footballer
Gwilym Emyr Owen III (born 1960), American singer-songwriter
Emyr Huws (Born 1993), Welsh Professional Footballer

Welsh masculine given names